William Daniel Frawley (born June 2, 1962) is a Canadian former professional ice hockey player. During his junior hockey years, Frawley played for the Sudbury Wolves of the OHA and the Cornwall Royals of the QMJHL, before being drafted by the Chicago Black Hawks, 204th overall in the 1980 NHL Entry Draft. Frawley spent most of the next two years playing in the AHL. While playing with the Cornwall Royals, the team won the 1981 memorial cup against the Kitchener Rangers.

NHL career
He played with the Blackhawks during the 1984–85 season (his NHL rookie season). On the 7 October 1985, Frawley was picked up off waivers by the Pittsburgh Penguins, the team he'd spent the next four years (the rest of his NHL career) with. His apparent leadership on the Penguins, was recognized with his appointment as captain in October 1987, a role he would hand over to Mario Lemieux two months later, because of a torn ligament that kept him out of the lineup. He received surgery for the injury and returned to play in early 1988.

Return to the minors
In 1989 Frawley returned to the AHL, retiring in 1993. However, he came out of retirement in 1995 and played two more years, with the Rochester Americans of the AHL, winning the 1996 Calder Cup. He retired from professional hockey a second time in 1998, after the 1997–98 season.

Amerks Hall Of Fame
In 2003, Frawley was selected to the Rochester Americans Hall Of Fame. His contributions as a longtime player, and his work ethic earned him this honor.

Career statistics

Post-retirement 
An Ojibwe from Nipissing First Nation, Frawley now resides in eastern Ontario, in Brinston, near Iroquois, with his wife, Wanda, and 4 sons.

Keeping active in the First Nations community, Frawley and other Indigenous former NHL players, such as Ted Nolan, John Chabot, and Denny Lambert took part in a charity match in Wiikwemkoong First Nation against the local police force January 28, 2017. Frawley and many other former native NHL players are very active in their native communities, engaging native youth as motivational speakers teaching about the importance of education, goal setting, substance abuse, and life skills that the future native leaders will need. They often host hockey clinics to encourage both young male and female athletes to enhance their physical skills as well as to develop an understanding of teamwork and cooperation with others. Since 2007, Frawley has been coaching minor hockey in the small native community of Chisasibi, using hockey as a means to teach young native athletes about the importance of education and physical activity. Initially, he was a hockey instructor for the Chisasibi Junior hunters minor midget team, and is now a youth hockey coordinator in Chisasibi.

Dan currently works for the Canadian Wildlife Federation.

References

External links

1962 births
Living people
Canadian ice hockey right wingers
Chicago Blackhawks draft picks
Chicago Blackhawks players
Cornwall Royals (OHL) players
Cornwall Royals (QMJHL) players
People from West Nipissing
Milwaukee Admirals (IHL) players
Muskegon Lumberjacks players
Pittsburgh Penguins players
Rochester Americans players
Springfield Indians players
Sudbury Wolves players
Ice hockey people from Ontario
First Nations sportspeople